Ceratobranchia is a genus of characins found in tropical South America.

Species
There are currently 5 recognized species in this genus:
 Ceratobranchia binghami C. H. Eigenmann, 1927
 Ceratobranchia delotaenia Chernoff & Machado-Allison, 1990
 Ceratobranchia elatior Tortonese, 1942
 Ceratobranchia joanae Chernoff & Machado-Allison, 1990
 Ceratobranchia obtusirostris C. H. Eigenmann, 1914

References

Characidae
Fish of South America